Kiri is a four-part British television crime drama miniseries starring Sarah Lancashire. It aired on Channel 4 from 10 to 31 January 2018.

Plot
The series is set in Bristol. It centres on the abduction of Kiri Akindele (Felicia Mukasa), a nine-year-old black girl. Kiri lives with her foster parents Jim and Alice Warner (Steven Mackintosh and Lia Williams) and their teenage son Simon (Finn Bennett). The Warners are a middle-class white couple who fostered her at age four and are about to adopt her. Miriam Grayson (Sarah Lancashire) is a disorganised middle-aged social worker. Kiri is in her care. Her boss is Julie Burnett (Claire Rushbrook). Kiri has been taken to the house of her paternal grandfather Tobi Akindele (Lucian Msamati) and his second wife for supervised visits once a month by Miriam, who has been investigated in relation to previous cases in which her decisions have resulted in negative outcomes. Kiri's father is 28-year-old Nathanial (Paapa Essiedu). He is a violent, drug dealing ex-convict from Peckham, London who has a history of grievous bodily harm and is not allowed to have contact with Kiri.

Cast and characters
Felicia Mukasa as Kiri Akindele, a girl aged 9 who disappears in the first episode
Sarah Lancashire as Miriam Grayson, a social worker caring for Kiri
Lucian Msamati as Tobi Akindele, Kiri's grandfather
Andi Osho as Rochelle Akindele, Tobi's second wife
Paapa Essiedu as Nathaniel Akindele, Kiri's father
Wunmi Mosaku as Detective Inspector Vanessa Mercer, police officer leading the investigation into Kiri's disappearance
Lia Williams as Alice Warner, Kiri's foster-mother and prospective adoptive mother
Steven Mackintosh as Jim Warner, Kiri's foster-father and prospective adoptive father
Finn Bennett as Simon Warner, son of Alice and Jim
Claire Rushbrook as Julie Burnett, Miriam's boss
Cara Theobold as Lucy Maxwell, a younger social worker who Miriam has mentored
Sue Johnston as Celia Grayson, Miriam's elderly mother

Episodes

According to Channel 4's stats released to Digital Spy on 9 February 2018, "An average of 2.1 million watched the show go out live, and it has become the biggest ever drama on All4, taking in half a million views per episode.
Kiri was watched on average by 4.9 million viewers with an 18.7% audience share (including on catch-up).

Music
The music for the series was scored by the British artist Clark. His work for the series was recompiled in his album Kiri Variations.

Reception
It was well received by television critics. However, it attracted criticism from some social workers; they perceived the programme as having a negative portrayal of their profession and said that an incompetent rule-breaker such as Miriam would not have kept her job for as long.

References

External links

2018 British television series debuts
2018 British television series endings
2010s British crime drama television series
2010s British mystery television series
2010s British television miniseries
Kidnapping in television
Channel 4 crime television shows
Channel 4 miniseries
Channel 4 television dramas
English-language television shows
Murder in television
Race and ethnicity in television
Television series about dysfunctional families
Television shows set in Bristol
Child abduction in television